The men's 50 metre breaststroke event at the 2014 Commonwealth Games, as part of the swimming programme, took place on 27 and 28 July at the Tollcross International Swimming Centre in Glasgow, Scotland.

The medals were presented by Dr. Sharad Rao, Honorary Legal Advisor of the Commonwealth Games Federation and the quaichs were presented by Prof. Lorne Crerar, Chairman of Harper Macleod.

Records
Prior to this competition, the existing world and Commonwealth Games records were as follows.

The following records were established during the competition:

Results

Heats

Semifinals

Final

References

External links

Men's 050 metre breaststroke
Commonwealth Games